The 1896–97 season was Newton Heath's fifth season in the Football League and their third in the Second Division. They finished second in the league, which earned them a chance for promotion back to the First Division. United played two Test matches against each of the bottom two teams from the First Division, but although they beat Burnley at Bank Street, they were unable to overcome Sunderland and remained in the Second Division. In the FA Cup, the Heathens managed to reach the Third Round, before losing 2–0 to Derby County for the second year in a row.

The club also entered teams in the Lancashire and Manchester Senior Cups in 1896–97. They were knocked out of the Lancashire Cup in the second round, losing 2–1 away to Burnley. In the Manchester Cup, they received a bye to the third round, where they beat Manchester City, before losing 2–0 to Bury in the semi-finals.

Second Division

Test matches

FA Cup

References

Manchester United F.C. seasons
Newton Heath F.C.